Wesley Charles (born 12 December 1975) is a Vincentian footballer. He was born in Brighton.

Career

Europe
Charles spent the beginning of the 2000s travelling Europe. His travels started in Ireland, where he first joined Bray Wanderers in November 2000 after spending two seasons with Sligo Rovers, where he was voted Player of the Year in 2003.

In July 2005, Charles signed for Russian Premier League club Rostov on loan for the remainder of their season, with an option to make the move permanent on a two-year contract at the end of it. He then returned to Republic of Ireland and Bray Wanderers. Charles then signed for Galway United in July 2006. He was appointed club captain for the 2007 season. He was released by Galway United in July 2008.

In March 2011, Charles returned to Europe and signed for League of Ireland First Division side Salthill Devon.

Canada
On 9 July 2008, he was released by Galway United. Two days later he signed by the Vancouver Whitecaps of the United Soccer Leagues First Division. On 12 October 2008, he helped the Whitecaps capture their second USL First Division Championship beating the Puerto Rico Islanders 2–1 in Vancouver

On 30 September 2008, Charles was called up for the USL First Division All-League Team. On 18 December the Whitecaps announced the contract extensions of Charles for the 2009 season.

On 22 July 2009, Charles was released by the Whitecaps after a second incident with a teammate in just over a month. The first incident with a teammate occurred during a home game on 12 June. Charles was involved in an altercation with teammate Charles Gbeke, which both players were fined and handed suspensions as a result. The second incident took place when Charles scuffled with teammate Jeff Parke during a training session on 21 July 2009.

On 19 July 2010 Charles signed with the Montreal Impact for the remainder of the 2010 season.

International
First appeared on the pitch wearing the national team jersey on 30 July 1995 in a match against Trinidad and Tobago. Charles has been capped numerous times at International level for St Vincent and the Grenadines. He played in 10 of 12 World Cup qualifiers in 2000, scoring twice. Charles also captained his country's national team in the 2010 Caribbean Cup.

Honors
Vancouver Whitecaps
USL First Division Championship (1): 2008

Career stats

References

External links

 Wesley Charles Interview

1975 births
Living people
Saint Vincent and the Grenadines footballers
Saint Vincent and the Grenadines expatriate footballers
League of Ireland players
Sligo Rovers F.C. players
Bray Wanderers F.C. players
FC Rostov players
Expatriate association footballers in the Republic of Ireland
Saint Vincent and the Grenadines expatriate sportspeople in Ireland
Galway United F.C. players
Vancouver Whitecaps (1986–2010) players
Vancouver Whitecaps Residency players
Montreal Impact (1992–2011) players
USL League Two players
USL First Division players
USSF Division 2 Professional League players
Salthill Devon F.C. players
Association football defenders
Saint Vincent and the Grenadines international footballers